Ultra Mega Power Projects (UMPP) are a series of ambitious power stations planned by the Government of India. This would entail the creation of an additional capacity of at least 100,000 MW by 2022.  Ultra Mega Power projects, each with a capacity of 4000 MW or above, are being developed with the aim of bridging this gap.

The UMPPs are seen as an expansion of the MPP (Mega Power Projects) projects that the Government of India undertook in the 1990s, but met with limited success. The Ministry of Power, in association with the Central Electricity Authority and Power Finance Corporation Ltd., has launched an initiative for the development of coal-based UMPP's in India. These projects will be awarded to developers on the basis of competitive bidding.

Based on supercritical technology, 16,000 MW of capacity has been contracted through the competitive bidding process for UMPPs. The average tariff for these projects is in the range of 2-3 per kWh which is much lower than the recent cost plus tariffs. The first UMPP, developed by Tata Power at Mundra, Gujarat has been commissioned and contributes 4,000 MW in power to the Western grid.

Special purpose vehicles
Special purpose vehicles (SPV) have been set up as wholly owned subsidiaries of the Power Finance Corporation for each UMPP that will be built. The SPV obtains various clearances, water linkage, coal mine allocation (for domestic coal based projects) etc. for the project. The SPV also initiates action for land acquisition in the name of the SPV, selects the developer through a tariff based competitive bidding process and finally transfers the SPV to the identified developer along with the various clearances, tie ups, etc. The developer is then responsible to build–own–operate (BOO) these UMPP plants.

List of UMPPs
According to the Power Finance Corporation, 15 UMPPs are envisioned. As of July 2012, 12 SPVs had been formed. Currently, two UMPPs have been commissioned. The table below shows the status of the 12 UMPPs for which SPVs have been formed.

Operational costs
The project is being developed with the intention of providing power to consumers at minimum cost. Because of the huge size of these power plants, the cost of the electricity would be lower due to the economies of scale. The plants are estimated to cost roughly 15,000 crores each to set up. The cost of generation per unit is estimated at under 2.

See also
Ultra Mega Solar Power Projects

References

External links
 The Electricity Act, 2003
 Official website of Power Finance Corporation detailing UMPP
 Problems of UMP - an article in Businessworld
 Government plans Ultra mega power projects
 Brief description of Ultra mega power projects
 UMPP projects on SourceWatch

 
Coal-fired power stations in India
Proposed coal-fired power stations
Proposed power stations in India